Turgay Salekh ogly Mokhbaliyev (born 18 January 2000) is a Russian football player. He plays for FC Legion Makhachkala.

Club career
He made his debut in the Russian Football National League for FC Rotor Volgograd on 17 November 2021 in a game against FC Metallurg Lipetsk.

References

External links
 
 Profile by Russian Football National League
 
 

2000 births
People from Babek District
Russian sportspeople of Azerbaijani descent
Azerbaijani emigrants to Russia
Living people
Russian footballers
Russia youth international footballers
FC Spartak-2 Moscow players
FC Ufa players
FC Rotor Volgograd players
Association football defenders
Russian Second League players
Russian First League players